Chris Ashmore (born 7 January 1942) is a British former racing driver.

See also
IMSA GT Championship
Motorsport in the United Kingdom

References

1942 births
Living people
British racing drivers
IMSA GT Championship drivers
World Sportscar Championship drivers
Place of birth missing (living people)
20th-century British people